Sukri Bommanagowda is a folk singer belonging to the Halakki Vokkaliga tribe in Ankola  , Karnataka  , India. She has received several awards, including the Padma Shri, one of India's highest civilian honours, for her contributions to the arts, and her work in preserving traditional tribal music.

Life 
Bommagowda was born into the Halakki Vokkaliga tribe, in Badigeri, in Uttara Kannada, and was married at the age of 16. She and her husband had two children, and adopted another child.

Career 
Bommagowda was taught to sing as a child by her mother, and has worked to preserve the traditional music and songs of the Halakki Vokkaliga tribe. Following the death of her husband, she began performing traditional music of the Halakki Vokkaliga tribe in Karnataka. She teaches traditional music and songs to members of her tribe. She has been described as the "nightingale of Halakki". Bommagowda has been publicly recognised for her work in preserving a large corpus of tribal songs as part of an oral tradition. All India Radio, India's national broadcast radio, and the Karnataka Janapada Academy have been working with Bommagowda to record, translate, and preserve these songs.

In 1988 her work was recognised by the Karnataka State government, and she has since been the recipient of multiple state awards and honours for her contributions to arts and music, including the Nadoja Award, and the Janapada Shri Award. In 2017, her work gained national recognition when she was awarded the Padma Shri, one of India's highest civilian honours, for her contributions to music.

In addition to her work in music, Bommagowda became a member of the gram panchayat, a local government body, in Badigeri, Karnataka.  Although illiterate herself, she has campaigned for literacy, especially among girls, and also has campaigned for a ban against alcohol in her area, following the deaths of her adopted son from alcohol poisoning.

Awards

In popular culture 
Bommagowda is featured in a Karnataka middle school textbook, in relation to her contributions to music.

References 

Living people
People from Karnataka
People from Uttara Kannada
Indian musicians
Recipients of the Padma Shri
Recipients of the Padma Shri in arts
Year of birth missing (living people)